Lawndale High School is one of three high schools in Lawndale, California, United States. The school was closed in 1981, and reopened in 1998. It is one of three schools in the Centinela Valley Union High School District.

In 2009, Lawndale High was awarded the California Distinguished Award. The principal was then Vicente Bravo.  During this time period, Lawndale was also awarded the US News Silver Medal for similar high schools throughout the nation. It was also a Title 1 Achievement school.

Lawndale High had an enrollment of 2,364 as of the 2013–14 school year.

Notable alumni
 Gary Allenson - former MLB baseball catcher for the Boston Red Sox and Toronto Blue Jays; and manager of the Norfolk Tides; Class of 1972
 Mike Battle - NFL safety for the New York Jets; Class of 1965
 Fred Dryer - actor and NFL Football player for the New York Giants and Los Angeles Rams; first round draft choice of the Giants; played in at least one NFL Pro Bowl game; Star DE player for San Diego State University; star of movies and TV series including Hunter (1984-1991) and several other television series and motion pictures; Class of 1964
 Tracy Jones - MLB player with the Cincinnati Reds and Detroit Tigers; Class of 1978
 Ricardo Lemvo - leader of Makina Loca, a Soukous band in Congo; Class of 1974
Chimezie Metu- Forward for the Sacramento Kings. Drafted 49th overall out of USC
Jalon Daniels - quarterback at the University of Kansas.
Terry Vance - AMA Motorcycle Association Hall of Fame, won 21 NHRA races and 14 national titles before retiring in 1988. Part owner of Vance & Hines Racing that races motorcycles in various division around the world. Class of 1971

External links
 Lawndale High School website
 Lawndale High alumni website

References 

High schools in Los Angeles County, California
Lawndale, California
Public high schools in California
1959 establishments in California